Vaccinium myrtillus  or European blueberry is a holarctic species of shrub with edible fruit of blue color, known by the common names bilberry, blaeberry, wimberry, and whortleberry. It is more precisely called common bilberry or blue whortleberry to distinguish it from other Vaccinium relatives.

Description
It has light green leaves that turn red in autumn and are simple and alternate in arrangement.

Common names 
Regional names include blaeberry (Scotland), urts or hurts (Cornwall and Devon), hurtleberry, myrtleberry, wimberry, whinberry, winberry, and fraughan.

Distribution and habitat 
Vaccinium myrtillus is a Holarctic species native to continental Northern Europe, the British Isles, northern Asia, Japan, Greenland, Iceland, western Canada, and the Western United States. It occurs in the acidic soils of heaths, boggy barrens, degraded meadows, open forests and parklands, slopes, and moraines. Bilberry and the related V. uliginosum appear to be unaffected by climate change.

Uses 

The fruits will stain hands, teeth and tongue deep blue or purple while eating and so it was traditionally used as a dye for food and clothes in Britain.

Fruit 
Vaccinium myrtillus has been used for centuries in traditional medicine, particularly in  traditional Austrian medicine as a tea or liqueur in attempts to treat various disorders. Bilberry dietary supplements are marketed in the United States, although there is little evidence these products have any effect on health or diseases.

In cooking, the bilberry fruit is commonly used for pies, tarts and flans, cakes, jams, muffins, cookies, sauces, syrups, juices, and candies.

Leaves 
In traditional medicine, bilberry leaves were used mainly for treating skin disorders. Consuming the leaves may be unsafe.

Harvesting 
Although bilberries are in high demand by consumers in northern Europe, the berries are harvested in the wild without any cultivation. Some authors state that opportunities exist to improve the crop if cultivated using common agricultural practices.

Chemistry 
Bilberry and the related V. uliginosum both produce lignins, in part because they are used as defensive chemicals. Although many plants change their lignin production – usually to increase it – to handle the stresses of climate change, lignin levels of both Vaccinium species appear to be unaffected.

V. myrtillus contains a high concentration of triterpenes which remain under laboratory research for their possible biological effects.

See also 
 Blaeberry River
 Mahonia aquifolium (Oregon grape)
 Myrtus

References

External links 

United States Department of Agriculture plants profile- Vaccinium myrtillus

myrtillus
Berries
Flora of Europe
Flora of Asia
Flora of temperate Asia
Flora of Western Canada
Flora of the Western United States
Flora of Alaska
Flora of Greenland
Flora of Iceland
Plants described in 1753
Taxa named by Carl Linnaeus
Medicinal plants
Subshrubs
Flora without expected TNC conservation status